Nesa Kuh (also Romanized as Nesā Kūh) is a village in Milas Rural District, in the Central District of Lordegan County, Chaharmahal and Bakhtiari Province, Iran. At the 2006 census, its population was 41, in 8 families.

References 

Populated places in Lordegan County